Wilderness Hex Sheets is a supplement published by Games Workshop (GW) in 1982 for use with fantasy role-playing games such as Dungeons & Dragons.

Contents
In the mid-1970s, Games Workshop became the UK distributor for the American role-playing game Dungeons & Dragons published by TSR, Inc. In 1978, GW then started to produce original licensed products for D&D, including a pad of character sheets, a pad of hex sheets, and the Dungeon Floor Plans accessory, each of which carried the Dungeons & Dragons trademark. They were some of the few licensed D&D products ever authorized by TSR.

In 1982, GW started to reprint some of these game aids, but this time solely as a GW product, without the TSR logo. By this time, D&D and other fantasy role-playing games had developed the custom of using a 1"-square grid for indoor and regional maps, and a hex grid for large-scale outdoor maps. Wilderness Hex Sheets, published in 1982 as a reprint of 1978's Hex Sheets, is a pad of 50 sheets marked with a hex grid. Gamemasters can use this to design wilderness campaigns, create large geographical areas or plan overland trips from one urban area to another.

Reception
Doug Cowie reviewed Wilderness Hex Sheets for Imagine magazine, and stated that "They are well produced and, given the proven usefulness of these aids, they should be helpful to any referee. My only reservation is with the price. They are about 30% dearer than similar sheets available 'loose' (i.e. not in pads). The only substantial difference is the superior packaging of the Games Workshop product."

References

Fantasy role-playing game supplements
Role-playing game mapping aids
Role-playing game supplements introduced in 1982